Ichikawa Raizō (市川 雷蔵) is a stage name used by Kabuki actors, beginning with a student of Ichikawa Danjūrō II; the use of the name 'Ichikawa' therefore emphasizes this connection.

Lineage

Ichikawa Raizō I (1724–67): student of Ichikawa Danjūrō II.
Ichikawa Raizō II (1754–78): son of Ichikawa Raizō I.
Ichikawa Raizō III (dates unknown): student of Ichikawa Danjūrō V.
Ichikawa Raizō IV (dates unknown): student of Ichikawa Danjūrō V.
Ichikawa Raizō V (1820–66): student of Ichikawa Danjūrō VII.
Ichikawa Raizō VI (1876-1901): student of Ichikawa Danjūrō IX.
Ichikawa Raizō VII (1890-?): student of Ichikawa Danjūrō IX; ceased acting in the mid-Taisho period, becoming an instructor of traditional Japanese dance.
Ichikawa Raizō VIII (1931–69): student of Ichikawa Jūkai III; also a film actor.

Kabuki actors